Bab al-Nasr meaning the Gate of Victory, is one of the nine historical gates of the Ancient City of Aleppo, Syria. 

It was rebuilt and renamed by az-Zahir Ghazi in 1212 in became the most important northern gate of the city.  

The structure was partially modified during Ottoman times and its role affected by mid-20th-century French urban planners.  

The gate received "moderate" damage during the Syrian civil war and restored by local committee in 2018.

Further reading 

 
 Bab al-Nasr urban extra mural context and description
Bab al-Nasr, Northern Gate of the Walled City: Record of Greek Funerary Inscription drawing
Rebuilding Aleppo: Life beyond Syria's civil war
Reopening event photographs
UNESCO Report on damage to Bab al-Nasr (p. 110-113)

References

Ayyubid architecture in Syria
Ziyarat
Nasr